Leyte (also Northern Leyte; ; Cebuano: Amihanang Leyte), officially the Province of Leyte, is a province in the Philippines located in the Eastern Visayas region, occupying the northern three-quarters of Leyte Island. Its capital is the city of Tacloban, administered independently from the province. Leyte is situated west of Samar Island, north of Southern Leyte and south of Biliran. To the west across the Camotes Sea is the province of Cebu.

The historical name of the Philippines, "Las Islas Felipenas", named by Spanish explorer Ruy López de Villalobos in honor of Prince Philip of Spain, used to refer to the islands of Leyte and Samar only, until it was adopted to refer to the entire archipelago.

The island of Leyte is known as Tandaya during the 16th century.

Leyte is also known as the site of the largest naval battle in modern history, the Battle of Leyte Gulf, which took place during the Second World War.

Leyte is especially prone to typhoons because it geographically faces toward the Pacific Ocean. On 8 November 2013, the province was severely affected by Super Typhoon Yolanda (Haiyan). The typhoon, known internationally as Haiyan, and domestically referred to as Yolanda, killed thousands of people and garnered significant international media attention. Leyte suffered similar destruction and loss of life in 1991 from Tropical Storm Thelma.

History

Pre-colonial period
The island of Leyte was once the location of Mairete, meaning land of Ete, a historic community which was ruled by Datu Ete centered in present-day municipality of Leyte and nearby towns. It was the oldest city-state in the entire Eastern Visayas region. Before being colonized by Spain, the island was once home to indigenous animist Warays to the East and other indigenous Hindu-Buddhist Visayan groups to the west.

Spanish period
The Spanish explorer Ruy López de Villalobos, first came to the island in 1543 and named it Las Islas Felipinas. When the Spanish government established government in Cebu, Leyte and Samar became part of the province of Cebu. In 1595, the religious Jesuits established mission in Carigara which preceded the mission established in Palo in 1596 and Ormoc and Alangalang missions in 1597. In 1735, Leyte and Samar were separated from Cebu to be established as a single provincial government with Carigara as the first provincial capital. Leyte had jurisdiction over Samar. In 1768, Leyte and Samar were split into two separate provinces.

American period

Division of Leyte

On March 27, 1923, Act No 3117 was proposed to divide Leyte into Occidental Leyte and Oriental Leyte but was not proclaimed by the Governor-General of the Philippines. On May 22, 1959, Republic Act No. 2227 was passed into law that separated the third Congressional District of Leyte into a separate province of Southern Leyte.

During the World War II era, the Leyte Provincial Capitol briefly became the seat of Philippine Commonwealth Government.

Battle of Leyte Gulf

The Battle of Leyte Gulf took place in the seas surrounding this island from 23 October to 26 October 1944. It was the largest naval battle in modern history, when at least 212 Allied ships clashed with the remnants of the Imperial Japanese Navy, some 60 ships, including the super battleships Yamato and Musashi.

The First Battle of Leyte occurred on 20 October 1944. A successful Allied invasion of the island was the crucial element to the eventual Filipino and American victory in the Philippines.

Geography

Leyte covers a total area of  occupying the northern and central sections of Leyte in the Eastern Visayas region. The province is situated west of Samar Island, north of Southern Leyte, south of Biliran, and east of the Camotes Sea.

Administrative divisions
Leyte comprises 40 municipalities and three cities, all clustered into 6 congressional districts.

Ormoc is an independent component city, while the capital Tacloban was declared a highly urbanized city in 2008. Both cities govern themselves independently of the province and their residents do not vote for elective provincial officials.

Baybay attained cityhood in 2007 but reverted to its municipal status when the Supreme Court declared its city charter unconstitutional in 2008. It regained its city status following the reversal of the Supreme Court decision dated December 22, 2009. In August 2010, however, a resolution had been passed reverting 16 cities, one of which was Baybay, to municipal status. It was on February 15, 2011, that the Supreme Court reversed its decision once again, allowing Baybay, along with the other 16 cities, to retain their cityhood status.

Demographics

The people of Leyte province are subdivided into two main ethnolinguistic groups. In the western part are the Cebuanos, and in the northern and eastern parts are the Warays.

Aside from Cebuano and Waray, most Leyteños can speak and understand Filipino and English. Some students who have studied the Spanish language and a few descendants of Spanish colonists can also speak and understand Spanish.

Leyte is predominantly a Roman Catholic Christian province. The 2000 census stated that 97% of Leyte's population adhered to Roman Catholicism, one of the highest percentages in the Visayas. The remaining 3% were adherents of other different Christian denominations and sects, such as the indigenous Iglesia ni Cristo, the Kingdom of Jesus Christ and Members Church of God International, popularly known as Ang Dating Daan, and many other foreign religious groups like the Mormons, Born Again Christians, Baptists, Pentecostals, Seventh-Day Adventists (Sabadistas), and many more.

Islam is also present in the province and concentrated in the metropolitan Tacloban area. It comprises 0.3% of Tacloban City's population, and its adherents are mainly the Maranao people and other Moro migrants from Mindanao who work mostly as traders.

Official provincial seal

The upper portion is a perspective of the national Freedom Park commemorating the landing of General Douglas MacArthur and the American Liberation Forces in Leyte during World War II. The white cross represents the 2nd phase of Leyte's development when Magellan stopped here on his way to Cebu. The alphabet on the cross argent is the ancient Visayan paleographic syllabary of the letter L which stands for Leyte. The stars around the inner circle symbolize the forty-one towns of Leyte and the everlasting flame symbolizes the soldiers who died during World War II.

Economy

The economy of Leyte is a mixed agriculture, fishing, industrial, energy and mining. Rice is farmed in the lowland plains areas specifically those around Tacloban, while coconut farming, is the main cash crop in upland and mountainous areas. Sugarcane plantation is no. 1 produce in Ormoc City. Since Leyte is an island province, fishing is a major source of livelihood among coastal residents.

The province is the site of the largest geothermal power plant in Asia, making it one of the resource-rich provinces of the Philippines. Excess energy of the numerous powerplants in the geothermal valley that generate electricity is supplied to the national grid that adds to the energy demand in Luzon and Mindanao. Mining industry has started to pick up in the province with the exploration in MacArthur. The iron smelting in Isabel has been operational for more than 20 years since its inception.

Leyte ICT Park
The Leyte Information Communications Technology (ICT) Park is one of the economic zones approved by the Philippine Economic Zone Authority (PEZA). Located at Pawing, Palo, Leyte, the 6.8 facility hosts two business process outsourcing (BPO) companies, namely, the Expert Global Solutions (EGS) Company (formerly APAC Customer Services, Inc.) and ACUDATA, Inc. (a financial and data services BPO). However, EGS decided to fully close its operations after its facility was destroyed by Typhoon Haiyan in 2013.

Leyte is emerging to be an ICT-BPO Hub for Eastern Visayas.

Transportation
Leyte is connected by air with its only commercial airport located in Tacloban City. Daniel Z. Romualdez Airport, which is one of the busiest airports in the Philippines, is served by three major airlines, Philippine Airlines, Cebu Pacific and AirAsia. Tacloban Airport primarily serves connecting flights from major Philippine cities (Manila and Cebu).

Philtranco, which has a bus stop in Tacloban and Ormoc, operates a route along Manila-Maharlika highway, passing through Allen, Northern Samar in Samar Island (via ferry boat) from Matnog, Sorsogon in Bicol region.

Commercial seaport is of vital importance. Major ports of the province are located at Ormoc City, in the south and Tacloban City, in the north. Small ports are also located in Palompon, San Isidro, Bato, Hilongos and Baybay.

See also
 Manuel Artigas
 Ruy López de Villalobos

References

External links

 
 
 
 Official Website of Leyte Province
 2007 Philippine Census Information
 Local Governance Performance Management System

 
Provinces of the Philippines
Provinces of Eastern Visayas
States and territories established in 1735
1735 establishments in the Philippines